Mirning (Mirniny) is a Pama–Nyungan language of Western Australia.

Murunitja was apparently a dialect of either Mirning or of its sister language Ngadjunmaya.

References

Mirning languages